Gladys Baldwin (18 September 1937 – 5 July 1982) was a Peruvian sports shooter. She competed at the 1968 Summer Olympics and the 1972 Summer Olympics. Along with Eulalia Rolińska (Poland) and Nuria Ortíz (Mexico) she was one of three women to compete in the shooting events at the 1968 Olympics.

References

1937 births
1982 deaths
Peruvian female sport shooters
Olympic shooters of Peru
Shooters at the 1968 Summer Olympics
Shooters at the 1972 Summer Olympics
Sportspeople from Callao
20th-century Peruvian women